Diana Slip was an early 20th-century French manufacturer of lingerie and fetishwear, founded by Léon (also known as Victor) Vidal, the publisher of Les Éditions Gauloises.  The company opened a luxurious boutique by the upmarket Madeleine district in Paris, between rue Royale and the Place Vendome. They employed renowned photographers of the time, including Roger Schall and Brassaï, to photograph their products. 
Their main competitor was Yva Richard.

References 

Lingerie retailers
20th-century fashion
Fetish clothing
Clothing companies of France